Assam – 16th largest, 15th most populous and 26th most literate state of the 28 states of the democratic Republic of India. Assam is at 14th position in life expectancy and 8th in female-to-male sex ratio. Assam is the 21st most media exposed states in India. The Economy of Assam is largely agriculture based with 69% of the population engaged in it. Growth rate of Assam's income has not kept pace with that of India's during the Post-British Era; differences increased rapidly since the 1970s. While the Indian economy grew at 6 percent per annum over the period of 1981 to 2000, the same of Assam's grew only by 3.3 percent.

General reference

Names
Official name: Assam
Common name: Assam
  
 

Etymology of Assam
Adjectival(s): Assamese
Demonym(s): Assamese, Asamiya 
Abbreviations and name codes
ISO 3166-2 code: IN-AS
Vehicle registration code: AS

Rankings (amongst India's states)
by population: 15th
by area (2011 census): 17th
by crime rate (2015): 3rd
by gross domestic product (GDP) (2014): 18th
by Human Development Index (HDI): 
by life expectancy at birth: 
by literacy rate:

Geography of Assam
Physical geography of Assam
Assam is:  an Indian state, one of the Seven Sister States

Location of Assam
Assam is situated within the following regions:
Northern Hemisphere
Eastern Hemisphere
Eurasia
Asia
South Asia
India
Northeast India
Time zone:  Indian Standard Time (UTC+05:30)

Environment of Assam
Biodiversity of Assam
Ecological issues in Assam
Rhino poaching in Assam

Natural geographic features of Assam
Rivers of Assam
Brahmaputra River
Barak River
Mora Dhansiri River
Dhansiri River
Dihing River
River Diphlu
Valleys in Assam
Brahmaputra Valley
Barak Valley
River Island
Majuli
Umananda
Dibru-Saikhowa

Protected areas of Assam 

Protected areas of Assam – Assam has five national parks (2.51% of State's geographical area) and 18 wildlife sanctuaries (1.88% of State's geographical area, including proposed) wildlife sanctuaries.

National Parks in Assam 

 Kaziranga National Park
 Manas National Park
 Nameri National Park
 Dibru-Saikhowa National Park
 Orang National Park
 Dihing Patkai National Park
Raimona National Park

Wildlife sanctuaries in Assam 

 Hoollongapar Gibbon Sanctuary 
 Garampani Wildlife Sanctuary 
 Bura Chapori Wildlife Sanctuary
 Bornadi Wildlife Sanctuary
 Sonai Rupai Wildlife Sanctuary
 Pobitora Wildlife Sanctuary 
 Panidihing Bird Sanctuary 
 Bherjan-Borajan-Padumoni Wildlife Sanctuary
 Nambor Wildlife Sanctuary
 North Karbi-Anglong Wildlife Sanctuary
 East Karbi-Anglong Wildlife Sanctuary
 Laokhowa Wildlife Sanctuary 
 Chakrashila Wildlife Sanctuary 
 Marat Longri Wildlife Sanctuary
 Nambor-Doigrung Wildlife Sanctuary 
 Dehing Patkai Wildlife Sanctuary 
 Borail Wildlife Sanctuary
 Amsang Wildlife Sanctuary

Administrative divisions of Assam

Divisions of Assam 
 North Assam
 Lower Assam
 Upper Assam
 Hills and Barak Valley

List of districts along with the district headquarters 

Districts of Assam – Assam had 27 districts till 15 August 2015 after which the Chief Minister of Assam Tarun Gogoi announced 5 more new districts taking the total no of districts to 32.
On 8 September 2016, Assam got 33rd district as Majuli (1st river island district of India)  
 Barpeta district - Barpeta
 Bongaigaon district - Bongaigaon
 Cachar district - Silchar
 Darrang district - Mangaldai
 Dhemaji district - Dhemaji
 Dhubri district - Dhubri
 Dibrugarh district - Dibrugarh
 Goalpara district - Goalpara
 Golaghat district - Golaghat
 Hailakandi district - Hailakandi
 Jorhat district - Jorhat
 Karbi Anglong district
 Karimganj district - Karimganj
 Kokrajhar district  - Kokrajhar
 Lakhimpur district - North Lakhimpur
 Majuli district - Garamur
 Morigaon district - Morigaon
 Nagaon district - Nagaon
 Nalbari district - Nalbari
 Dima Hasao district - Haflong
 Sivasagar district - Sivasagar
 Sonitpur district - Tezpur
 Tinsukia district - Tinsukia
 Kamrup district - Amingaon
 Kamrup Metropolitan district - Guwahati
 Baksa district -Mushalpur
 Udalguri district -Udalguri
 Chirang district -Kajalgaon
 West Karbi Anglong district
 Bishwanath district - Bishwanath Chariali
 Hojai - Hojai
 Charaideo -Sonari
 South Salmara-Mankachar
Assam have 78 sub-divisions under 33 districts.

Municipalities in Assam 

 Cities and towns in Assam
 Capital of Assam: Dispur
 Barpeta
 Bongaigaon
 Dhubri
 Dibrugarh
 Diphu
 Goalpara
 Golaghat 
 Guwahati
 Jorhat
 Karimganj
 Kokrajhar.    
 Nagaon
 North Lakhimpur
 Sivasagar
 Silchar
 Tezpur
 Tinsukia
 Cities in Assam by population

Demographics of Assam 

People of Assam

Population demographics 

Total population of Assam was 26.66 million with 4.91 million households in 2001.

Religion demographics of Assam 

Religion demographics of Assam – according to the 2011 census, 61.5% were Hindus, 34.22% were Muslims. Christian minorities (3.7%) are found among Scheduled Tribe population. Other religions followed include Jainism (0.1%), Buddhism (0.2%), Sikhism (0.1%) and Animism (amongst Khamti, Phake, Aiton etc. communities).

Language demographics

Government and politics of Assam 

Politics of Assam
 Form of government: Indian state government (parliamentary system of representative democracy)
 Capital of Assam: Dispur
 Elections in Assam

Union government in Assam 
 Rajya Sabha members from Assam
 Assam Pradesh Congress Committee

Branches of the government of Assam 

Government of Assam

Executive branch of the government of Assam 

 Head of government: Governor of Assam (nominal)
 Governors of Assam
 Raj Bhavan – official residence of the governor of Assam.
 Head of state: Chief Minister of Assam
 Chief Ministers of Assam
 Departments and agencies of Assam
 Assam Institute of Management
 Assam State Electricity Board
 Assam State Film (Finance and Development) Corporation Ltd.
 Assam State Transport Corporation
 Department of Environment and Forests, Government of Assam
 Guwahati Metropolitan Development Authority
 Secondary Education Board of Assam

Legislative branch of the government of Assam 

 Assam Legislative Assembly (unicameral)
 Constituencies of Assam Legislative Assembly

Judicial branch of the government of Assam 

 Gauhati High Court

Law in Assam 

 Human rights abuses in Assam
 Law enforcement in Assam
 Law enforcement agencies in Assam
 Assam Police
 Taxation
 Assam General Sales Tax

Military in Assam 

Military of India – the states of India do not have their own militaries. The government of India oversees the defense of the country and its states.
 Assam Rifles
 Assam Regiment

History of Assam 

History of Assam
 Assam Mail
 Timeline of Assam History

History of Assam, by period

Prehistoric Assam 

 Pragjyotisha Kingdom
 Danava dynasty
 Naraka dynasty

Ancient Assam 

 Davaka
 Kamarupa

Medieval Assam 

 Ahom kingdom
 Chutiya Kingdom
 Kachari Kingdom
 Kamata Kingdom
 Baro-Bhuyan

Colonial Assam 

 British annexation of Assam
 Burmese invasions of Assam (1817 - 1826)
 Colonial Assam (1826 - 1947)
 Assam Province (1912 - 1947)
 Assam Bengal Railway

Contemporary Assam 

 Legislature of Assam (Since 1937)
 Undivided Assam (1947 - 1963)
 Assam separatist movements
 Assam Movement
 Assam Accord
 2009 Assam bombings
 2012 Assam violence
 May 2014 Assam violence
 December 2014 Assam violence
 2016 Assam floods

History of Assam, by region

History of Assam, by district 

 History of Barpeta district
 History of Bongaigaon district
 History of Cachar district
 History of Darrang district
 History of Dhemaji district
 History of Dhubri district
 History of Dibrugarh district
 History of Goalpara district
 History of Golaghat district
 History of Hailakandi district
 History of Jorhat district
 History of Karbi Anglong district
 History of Karimganj district
 History of Kokrajhar district
 History of Lakhimpur district
 History of Morigaon district
 History of Nagaon district
 History of Nalbari district
 History of Dima Hasao district
 History of Sivasagar district
 History of Sonitpur district
 History of Tinsukia district
 History of Kamrup district
 History of Kamrup Metropolitan district
 History of Baksa district
 History of Udalguri district
 History of Chirang district
 History of West Karbi Anglong district
 Bishwanath - History of Bishwanath Chariali
 History of Hojai
 History of Charaideo
 History of South Salmara-Mankachar district

History of Assam, by city or town 

 History of Bongaigaon
 History of Dhubri
 History of Dibrugarh
 History of Golaghat 
 History of Guwahati
 History of Jorhat
 Timeline of Jorhat
 History of Karimganj
 History of Sivasagar
 History of Silchar
 History of Tezpur
 History of Tinsukia

History of Assam, by subject 

 Assam Bengal Railway
 Assam separatist movements

Culture of Assam 

Culture of Assam
 Cuisine of Assam
 Assam Tea
 Gamosa
 Languages of Assam
 Assamese script
 Assamese Jolpan
 Monuments in Assam
 Monuments of National Importance in Assam
 State Protected Monuments in Assam
 Textiles and dresses of Assam
 Muga silk
 Eri silk

Art in Assam 

 Cinema of Assam
 Joymati, first Assamese motion picture
 Assam State Film (Finance and Development) Corporation Ltd.
 Fine Arts of Assam
 Music of Assam
 Traditional crafts of Assam

Dance of Assam 

 Folk dances of Assam
Bagurumba
 Bihu Dance
 Jhumur 
 Ekasarana Dharma
 Borgeet
 Sattra
 Sattriya Dance

Literature of Assam 

Assamese literature
 Assamese poetry
 Assamese Poets
 Assamese writers' Pen Names
 Assamese Periodicals
 The Arunodoi (Orunodoi - 1846) 
 The Hemkosh
 The Assam Tribune
 Assam Rhetorical Congress
 Buranji
 Kirtan Ghosa
 Dasham
 Namghosa
 Kotha Ramayana
Saptakanda Ramayana

Music of Assam 

Music of Assam
 Goalpariya lokageet
 Tokari geet
 Dihanaam
 Hiranaam
 Dhol
 Gogona
 Pepa

Festivities in Assam

Festivals in Assam 

 Ali Ai Ligang
 Bathow
 Bihu
 Brahmaputra Beach Festival
 Bwisagu
Beshoma
 Dehing Patkai Festival
 Garja
 Hacha-kekan
 Hapsa Hatarnai
 Kaziranga Elephant Festival
 Kherai
 Magh Bihu
 Majuli Festival
 Me-Dam-Me-Phi
 Porag 
 Rongker
 Sokk-erroi
 Tea Festival

Fairs in Assam 
 Ambubachi Mela
 Chunbîl Melâ (Jonbeel Mela) 
 Rongali Utsav

Languages in Assam 

 Assamese language
 Bengali language
 Bodo language
 Nepali language
 Bishnupriya Manipuri language

People of Assam 

People of Assam
 Assamese people 
Ahom people
 Assamese Brahmins
 Kalitas
 Koch Rajbongshi
 Chutiya people
Na Asamiya
 Tribes of Assam
Tea-tribes of Assam
Bodo
Mising 
Karbi 
Tiwa (Lalung)
Deori people
Bodo-Kachari people
Naga people
Dimasa people
 List of people from Assam

Notable surnames in Assam 

 Barua (and its variations)
 Borah
 Bharali
 Borbarua
 Borgohain
 Borpatrogohain
 Borphukan
 Burhagohain
 Chakraborty
 Choudhury (and its variations)
 Das
 Deka
 Dutta
 Gayen
 Gogoi
 Gohain
 Goswami
 Hazarika
 Kalita
 Saikia
 Sarma 
 Chutia
 Sutradhar
Kurmi

Religion in Assam 

Religion in Assam
 Christianity in Assam
 Anglican Diocese of Assam
 Assam Baptist Convention
 Islam in Assam
 Jainism in Assam

Hinduism in Assam 

Hinduism in India
 Hindu temples in Assam
 Basistha Temple
 Bhairabi Temple
 Dirgheshwari temple
 Da Parbatia
 Hatimura Temple
 Hayagriva Madhava Temple
 Kamakhya Temple
 Ketakeshwar Dewal
 Lankeshwar Temple
 Mahabhairav Temple
 Mahamaya Dham
 Navagraha temples
 Negheriting Shiva Doul
 Rangnath Dol
 Rudreswar Temple
 Sivadol
 Sukreswar Temple
 Ugro Tara Temple
 Umananda Temple

Sports in Assam 

Sports in Assam
 Cricket in Assam
 Assam Cricket Association
 Assam cricket team
 National Sports Council of Assam Ground
 Football in Assam
 Assam football team
 Assam Football Association
 Assam State Premier League

Symbols of Assam 

Symbols of Assam
 State animal: One-horned rhinoceros
 State bird: White-winged wood duck
 State dance: Bihu dance
 State festival: Bihu
 State flower: Foxtail Orchids
 State language: Assamese
 State motto: Joy Aai Asom (Hail mother Assam)
 State seal: 
 State song: O Mur Apunar Desh
 State tree: Hollong  (Dipterocarpus macrocarpus)

Economy and infrastructure of Assam 

Economy of Assam
 Energy in Assam
 Assam State Electricity Board
 Tourism in Assam
 Transport in Assam
 Assam State Transport Corporation
 State highways in Assam
 Water supply and sanitation in Assam
 Dams and reservoirs in Assam

Education in Assam 

Education in Assam

 Educational institutions in Assam
 Secondary Education Board of Assam
 Higher education in Assam
Assam Higher Secondary Education Council
 Universities in Assam
State universities in Assam
Assam Agricultural University
 Assam Rajiv Gandhi University of Cooperative Management
 Assam Science and Technology University
 Assam Women's University
 Bodoland University
Cotton University
 Dibrugarh University
 Gauhati University
 Krishna Kanta Handiqui State Open University
 Kumar Bhaskar Varman Sanskrit and Ancient Studies University
 National Law University and Judicial Academy
 Srimanta Sankaradeva University of Health Sciences
 Central universities in Assam
 Assam University
 Tezpur University
 Private universities in Assam
 Assam Don Bosco University
 Assam Down Town University
 Kaziranga University

Health in Assam 

 Assam Nurses Midwives & Health Visitor Council
 Hospitals in Assam
 Gauhati Medical College and Hospital

See also 
 Outline of India

References

External links 

 
 Assam Tourism Guide (official)
 
 

Assam
Assam